Kryszpin - is a Polish coat of arms. It was used by several szlachta families in the times of the Polish–Lithuanian Commonwealth.

History
The exact story behind this coat of arms is unknown. Both its blazoning and the features used are probably of foreign origin and were naturalised in Polish heraldry sometime in the 16th century, probably of German origin. It is somehow related to the Nieczuja coat of arms.

Blazon
Parted per pale, or and azure, in dexter two deer heads couped argent, in sinister lion passant argent. Both divided by a tree rump proper.

Out of a crest coronet, between two vols, peacock's feathers.

Notable bearers
Notable bearers of this coat of arms include:
 Hieronim Kirszensztajn, podskarbi of Lithuania (1663–1676)
 Andrzej Kryszpin, voivod of Vitebsk

See also
 Polish heraldry
 Heraldry
 Coat of arms

Polish coats of arms